LCR Team is a motorcycle racing team currently competing in the MotoGP World Championship under the name LCR Honda Castrol with rider Álex Rins and LCR Honda Idemitsu with rider Takaaki Nakagami, as well as the MotoE World Cup under the name LCR E-Team. The team was founded in 1996 by Italian rider Lucio Cecchinello.

History

1996–2003: Lucio Cecchinello era
The team was set up by Italian rider Lucio Cecchinello in 1996 (LCR being an initialism for Lucio Cecchinello Racing). He set up his own team for the 125cc World Championship using Honda motorcycles, earning several top ten returns. Similar results followed in the 1997.

In the 1998 the team recruited two-time 125cc runner-up Noboru Ueda to ride alongside Cecchinello. In only his second race for the team, Ueda got the team their first Grand Prix victory in the Malaysian Grand Prix at Johor Circuit. Cecchinello's first win for his own team came later that year in Madrid Grand Prix at Jarama. Cecchinello finished 5th in overall standings while Ueda only managed to finish 13th after missing half of the season due to injury. Hiroyuki Kikuchi was drafted as Ueda's replacement during his absence.

The Cecchinello-Ueda partnership continued in 1999 and 2000, yielding another win by Ueda in 1999 Brazilian Grand Prix as well as numerous podiums for both riders. Ueda finished both seasons in 5th position while Cecchinello struggled to match his teammates performance and was only able to finish in 9th and 11th position in those seasons.

In 2001 the team switched to Aprilia motorcycles. The team also recruited the Spanish youngster Raúl Jara as Cecchinello's teammate. Cecchinello's performance improved and he took the first win with Aprilia at the Catalan Grand Prix and finished the season 4th in overall standings.

In 2002 the team expanded their operation into 250cc class. San Marinese rider Alex de Angelis was recruited to partner Cecchinello in 125cc, while the young Australian rookie, Casey Stoner and the Spanish David Checa were recruited to compete in 250cc class. Cecchinello managed to repeat the last years performance and once again finished the season 4th in overall standing with 3 wins while De Angelis has his first career podium and finished 9th overall. In the 250cc class, Stoner and Checa were able to achieve several top ten finish in the team's 250cc debut season.

In 2003 the team continued their double assault in 125cc and 250cc. Casey Stoner switched to the 125cc class to partner with Cecchinello, while French rider Randy de Puniet was recruited to ride in 250cc. Both teams had a successful season with 3 race wins in each class. De Puniet, was also in contention for the World Championship. However, he only managed to finished 4th overall with 3 wins and 9 podiums. In 125cc, Cecchinello achieved 2 wins including a win in his home Grand Prix while Stoner achieved both his first career podium and his first career win with the team. At the end of 2003, Cecchinello decided to end his racing career and concentrate in team management.

2004–2005: Post-Cecchinello era
In 2004 the team retained de Puniet to ride an official Aprilia factory bike in 250cc. In the 125cc class, the team recruited two Italian riders, a former 125cc World Champion Roberto Locatelli and rookie Mattia Pasini. Both de Puniet and Locatelli had successful season and were in contention for the World Championship although they were only managed to finish the season 3rd in overall standings. De Puniet had 1 win and 8 podiums while Locatelli had 2 wins and 6 podiums.

For the 2005 season the team only competed in the 250cc class on Aprilia factory bikes. Roberto Locatelli moved up to 250cc and Casey Stoner returned from his one-year stint at KTM. Stoner managed to record 5 wins, 10 podiums and finished the season as runner-up to Dani Pedrosa. Stoner's runner-up was the best result so far in the team history. Stoner was also the first LCR rider to have more than 3 race wins in a season.

2006–present: Move to MotoGP

Casey Stoner (2006) and Carlos Checa (2007)
In October 2005, the team, along with Casey Stoner, reportedly had an agreement to move to the MotoGP class in the upcoming season with support from Yamaha. After the season ended, Stoner received an offer from the Honda Pons team and tested the Honda RC211V bike with them at Valencia. With Stoner leaving the team, LCR had to put their MotoGP project on hold. However, in December 2005, Stoner unexpectedly became available again after Honda Pons failed to secure sponsorship for the upcoming season. LCR immediately re-signed Stoner and made an agreement with HRC to run the RC211V in 2006.

Stoner recorded the team's first pole position in only their second MotoGP race at the Qatar Grand Prix. The subsequent race in Turkey saw LCR and Stoner record their first podium in MotoGP. Stoner competed with Marco Melandri the entire race, until Melandri managed to beat him to the line. Stoner went on to finish the season in 8th position with a series of top 10 results. Veteran Spanish rider Carlos Checa replaced him at the team, riding the new 800cc Honda RC212V. However, the team was not able to repeat their impressive 2006 results, as Checa struggled to adapt to the new 800cc bike and his best finish was a sixth place at the Spanish and San Marino Grands Prix.

Randy de Puniet (2008–10) and Toni Elias (2011)
Again, the team struggled with the satellite bike and Michelin tyres. De Puniet's best finish was only sixth position at the United States Grand Prix. De Puniet returned for the  season, once again with the RC212V, but with Bridgestone tyres, as MotoGP shifted to a single tyre manufacturer rule. In the British Grand Prix, De Puniet finished third, his best result with the team, and the team's first podium in the premier class since Stoner's 2006 podium. In , de Puniet finished the season in ninth place aboard a Honda RC212V, with his best result being a fourth place at the Catalan Grand Prix. After the departure of de Puniet to the Pramac Racing team, the team signed reigning Moto2 world champion Toni Elías for the 2011 season, and Elías finished 15th in the championship, finishing five races in the top ten.

Stefan Bradl (2012–14)
At the end of 2011, the team signed German Stefan Bradl, who had just won the Moto2 championship. Bradl rode the all-new Honda RC213V, and had a good season, finishing consistently in the top-10. His best result was a fourth-place finish at Mugello. He won the Rookie of the Year award, finishing eighth in the championship.

2013 was even better for Bradl, as he was consistently fighting for top five places. Bradl took his first premier class pole position at the United States Grand Prix at Laguna Seca. He finished second in the race, his first MotoGP podium. However a broken ankle sustained in a crash in Malaysia cost him a top five finish in the final championship standings. Bradl eventually finished the season in seventh place.

2 bikes expansion (2015)

Midway through the 2014 season, it was announced that LCR would expand to a two-bike satellite Honda team in 2015. The team's second bike is an open-specification Honda RC213V-RS, "replacing" Gresini Racing, as they will become an Aprilia factory team. The team also announced a partnership with foreign exchange trading company CWM FX, and they were represented by British rider Cal Crutchlow on a factory-specification Honda RC213V bike, and Australian rookie Jack Miller, riding the open-specification RC213V-RS.

After the 2015 Czech Republic Grand Prix, CWM pulled out of the team due to fraud allegations following a police raid in March 2015. The sponsorship was run by their long-term sponsor, Givi. At Sepang, Crutchlow's bike represented a new livery from Castrol.

Cal Crutchlow and first MotoGP victory (2016–2017)

Miller left the team in 2016 to join Estrella Galicia 0,0 Marc VDS, leaving Crutchlow as the sole rider for LCR in 2016. Crutchlow started the season poorly, with 4 DNFs and 1 finish outside the points in the first 8 races leaving him outside the top 15 of the standings. He then finished second in the German Grand Prix before taking his first victory in Brno just two races later. This was LCR's first ever win in the premier class, and also was the first race win by a British rider in the 500cc/MotoGP class since Barry Sheene at the 1981 Swedish Grand Prix. His victory in Brno was also part of MotoGP's record of eight different riders winning in eight successive races, with Crutchlow's Brno victory being the sixth in the streak. He then scored another podium in Silverstone before taking another victory at Phillip Island, making him the first Briton ever to win the Australian Grand Prix. He ended the year with 141 points, finishing seventh in the championship.

In 2017, Crutchlow scored one podium finish and was ninth in the riders' world championship.

Re-expansion to 2 bikes, MotoE (2018–present)

For 2018, LCR Team signed Japanese rookie Takaaki Nakagami to partner Crutchlow. The team ran separate liveries with different main sponsors for each rider, Castrol for Crutchlow and Idemitsu for Nakagami. Nakagami's best finish was sixth place at the season finale in Valencia, ultimately finishing 20th in the riders' championship. Crutchlow started the year with a win in Argentina and scored podium finishes in Misano and Motegi. He had to finish season early after a crash at the Australian GP, fracturing his leg and missing the final three races of the season. Crutchlow finished the season with 148 points and seventh in the riders' championship. Former LCR rider Stefan Bradl replaced Crutchlow for the final two races.

In 2019, Crutchlow achieved 3 podiums and finished 9th in the championship. Nakagami improved to 13th place, despite missing the final three rounds of the season to undergo surgery. He was replaced in the final three rounds by Johann Zarco. As a satellite team in MotoGP, LCR was invited two enter the inaugural MotoE season and did so with Niccolò Canepa and former LCR 250cc and MotoGP rider Randy de Puniet.

In 2020, de Puniet was replaced on the MotoE team by Belgian Xavier Siméon.

Results

By season

* Season still in progress.

MotoGP results

By rider

By year

(key) (Races in bold indicate pole position; races in italics indicate fastest lap)

* Season still in progress.

Notes

References

External links
 

Motorcycle racing teams
Motorcycle racing teams established in 1996
1996 establishments in Europe